Pinya, or Vijayapura, was the capital of the Kingdom of Pinya, located near Ava, Mandalay Region, Myanmar. It was the residence of the Pinya dynasty who ruled this part of central Myanmar from 1313 to 1365. It was founded by King Thihathu as Wizayapura on 7 February 1313.

Notes

References

Populated places established in the 1310s
Populated places in Mandalay Region
1313 establishments in Asia